Kenneth Clay Jolly (born February 28, 1962) is a former American football linebacker in the National Football League. He played for the Kansas City Chiefs. He played college football for the Park College and MidAmerica Nazarene University.

References

1962 births
Living people
American football linebackers
Kansas City Chiefs players